Stansell is a surname. Notable people with the surname include:

John Lawrence Stansell (1875–1956), a Conservative member of the Canadian House of Commons
Keith Stansell, American who was held hostage by the Revolutionary Armed Forces of Colombia during 

See also
Stansel